Dlouhá Třebová is a municipality and village in Ústí nad Orlicí District in the Pardubice Region of the Czech Republic. It has about 1,300 inhabitants.

History

The first written mention of Dlouhá Třebová is from 1304.

Sights
The landmark of Dlouhá Třebová is the Church of Saint Procopius built in 1906.

References

External links

Villages in Ústí nad Orlicí District